Dallas Treymell Thomas (born October 30, 1989) is a former American football guard. He was drafted by the Miami Dolphins in the third round of the 2013 NFL Draft, for whom he played until October 2016. He played college football at Tennessee.

Early years
Thomas was born in Baton Rouge, Louisiana. While attending Scotlandville Magnet High School in Baton Rouge, he played high school football for the Scotlandville Hornets.

College career
Thomas attended the University of Tennessee, where he played for the Tennessee Volunteers football team from 2008 to 2012. During his college career, he started 37 of 50 games in which he appeared at offensive tackle and guard. As a senior in 2012, he received third-team All-American honors from CBSSports.com, and was a second-team All-Southeastern Conference (SEC) selection.

Professional career

Miami Dolphins
The Miami Dolphins selected Thomas in the third round (77th overall) of the 2013 NFL Draft.

On October 9, 2016, Thomas started at left guard after Billy Turner was moved to left tackle since both the starting left tackle, Branden Albert, and the backup left tackle, Laremy Tunsil, both missed the game due to illness and injury, respectively. Thomas and Turner were both released two days later after they had a disastrous performance during the 30-17 loss to the Tennessee Titans.

Philadelphia Eagles
On January 18, 2017, Thomas signed a reserve/future contract with the Eagles. He was waived on September 2, 2017.

Memphis Express
In 2018, Thomas signed with the Memphis Express of the AAF for the 2019 season. The league ceased operations in April 2019.

In October 2019, Thomas was selected by the St. Louis BattleHawks in the 2020 XFL Draft.

References

External links
Tennessee Volunteers bio

1989 births
Living people
American football offensive tackles
American football offensive guards
Tennessee Volunteers football players
Players of American football from Baton Rouge, Louisiana
Miami Dolphins players
Philadelphia Eagles players
Memphis Express (American football) players